Roddy Lenga is a Vanuatuan footballer who plays as a midfielder.

References 

Living people
1990 births
Vanuatuan footballers
Vanuatu international footballers
Association football midfielders
Vanuatu youth international footballers
Nalkutan F.C. players
2012 OFC Nations Cup players